Mordellistena rodericensis is a species of beetle in the genus Mordellistena of the family Mordellidae. It was described by Blair.

References

robusticollis